Mad Amos is a 1996 short story collection by the American speculative fiction author Alan Dean Foster. The stories (only two of which were previously unpublished) center on the character of Amos Malone, a mountain man in the 19th century American West. Mad Amos' knowledge of the occult and the fantastic brings him and his trusty but temperamental steed, the unicorn Worthless, into various adventures.

Contents
"Wu-Ling's Folly"
"Ferrohippus"
"Witchen Woes"
"Jackalope"
"The Chrome Comanche"
"Agrarian Deform"
"Having Words"
"What You See . . ."
"Neither a Borrower Be . . ."
"The Purl of the Pacific"

See also

Weird West
Jackalope

References

1996 short story collections
Books by Alan Dean Foster
Fantasy short story collections
Science fiction Westerns
American short story collections